America as Seen by a Frenchman is a 1960 French documentary film directed by François Reichenbach. It was entered into the 1960 Cannes Film Festival.

Cast
 Paul Klinger as Voice (German language version)
 June Richmond as Sings: The Zulu-Song

References

External links

1960 films
1960 documentary films
1960s French-language films
French documentary films
Films directed by François Reichenbach
Documentary films about the United States
1960s French films